The 1979 Bandy World Championship was contested between four men's bandy playing nations. The championship was played in Sweden from 27 January-4 February 1979. Soviet Union became champions.

Participants

Premier tour
 27 January
 Norway – Finland 2–8
 Soviet Union – Sweden 4–3
 28 January
 Norway – Sweden 1–7
 Soviet Union – Finland 4–4
 30 January
 Finland – Sweden 1–8
 Soviet Union – Norway 6–4
 1 February
 Norway – Sweden 0–4
 Soviet Union – Finland 6–3
 2 February
 Finland – Sweden 1–7
 Soviet Union – Norway 7–2
 4 February
 Norway – Finland 2–6
 Soviet Union – Sweden 4–2

References

1979
World Championships
Bandy World Championships
International bandy competitions hosted by Sweden
Bandy World Championships
Bandy World Championships
International sports competitions in Gothenburg
1970s in Gothenburg